Samia Akariou is a Moroccan actress and director born (28 May 1972) in Chefchaouen, Morocco.

Biography 
Samia Akariou was born in 1972 in the town of Chefchaouen, Morocco. She studied and graduated from the Higher Institute of Dramatic Arts and Cultural Activities (ISADAC) and the Higher National Drama Paris Conservatoire.

She began her career in theater by presenting several pieces, then the cinema in the film (Lalla Hobbi) Mohamed Abderrahman Tazi of who did it truly known to the public. She worked in films Tricks women Farida Belyazid, Friends yesterday by Hassan Benjelloun and Ali, Rabiaa and Others ... Ahmed Boulane.

References

External links 
 

1972 births
Moroccan actresses
Living people
People from Chefchaouen